Abdulai Massaudu is a Ghanaian professional footballer who plays as a defender for Ghanaian Premier League side Dreams F.C.

Career

Proud FC 
Massaudu played for lower-tier side Proud FC before moving to play for Dreams FC as a guest player in the GHALCA Top 8 Tournament. He was later transferred to Dreams on a permanent deal January 2018.

Dreams FC 
Massaudu joined Dreams FC initially as a guest player on a short-term deal during the GHALCA Top 8 Tournament. In January 2018, he signed a four-year deal with the Accra-based side after passing his mandatory medical screening. He started training with the club officially in January 2018, ahead of the 2018 Ghanaian Premier League season. He made his debut on 17 March 2018, playing the full 90 minutes in a 1–0 victory over Elmina Sharks. He featured in 14 out of 15 league matches before the league was abandoned due to the dissolution of the GFA in June 2018, as a result of the Anas Number 12 Expose. He played 6 league matches during the 2019 GFA Normalization Committee Special Competition.

During the 2019–20 Ghana Premier League, he made 11 matches before the league was put on hold and later cancelled as a result of the COVID-19 pandemic. He was named on the club's squad list for the 2020–21 Ghana Premier League in the club's bid to push for a top 4 league position at the end of the season.

References

External links 

 

Living people
Association football defenders
Ghanaian footballers
Dreams F.C. (Ghana) players
Ghana Premier League players
Year of birth missing (living people)